Morricone Youth is a New York City band formed in 1999 dedicated to writing, performing and recording music written for the moving image (e.g., film and television soundtrack and library production music).  The band is composed of present or past members of Creedle, The Rugburns, Crash Worship, Palomar, Pretendo, Pain Teens, Yellowbirds, Fruit Bats and Mikael Jorgensen of Wilco's Pronto.

The band regularly composes and performs original music to projected films (e.g., silent films, midnight movies, animated films) in live settings including Jean Rollin's Fascination (1979), David Lynch's Eraserhead (1977), Rene Laloux's Fantastic Planet (1973), Lotte Reiniger's The Adventures of Prince Achmed (1926), Alfred Hitchcock's The Lodger: A Story of the London Fog (1927), George A. Romero's Night of the Living Dead (1968), Ron and Valerie Taylor's Inner Space (1972), Robert Clouse's Enter the Dragon (1973), Jack Hill's Foxy Brown (1974), Mario Bava's Danger: Diabolik (1968), Saul Bass's Phase IV (1974), George Miller's Mad Max (1979), Sergei Eisenstein's Battleship Potemkin (1925) and F.W. Murnau's Nosferatu (1922) and Sunrise: A Song of Two Humans (1927).  In addition to composing its own compositions and themes for such films, the band is committed to reinterpreting portions of the original score for each film it performs.  Morricone Youth is currently in the process of recording and releasing a vinyl (and digital) LP or EP for each of the fifteen live scores it has performed to date.  The first two, EPs for Night of the Living Dead and The Adventures of Prince Achmed, were released in September 2016.  A full length LP for Mad Max was released in January 2017 and the Sunrise: A Song Of Two Humans LP is scheduled for release on August 9, 2017.  The band has performed at Brooklyn Academy of Music (BAM), Philadelphia Museum of Art, Massachusetts Museum of Contemporary Art (MASS MoCA) and Sydney Festival.  In 2017, the band supported 1970s Italian prog soundtrack legends Goblin on their North American "Sound of Fear" tour.

Morricone Youth recorded its debut full length album of original music entitled Silenzio Violento in 2004 with Martin Bisi at B.C. Studio in Brooklyn, New York released on October 8, 2005 by Country Club Records.  Four songs from Silenzio Violento were used in documentary film Second Skin directed by Juan Carlos Pineiro about MMORPGs (Massively Multiplayer Online Role Playing Games) and the people who play them.  The film premiered at the SXSW Film Festival in March 2008.

Although the band was mostly inactive from 2007 to 2010, Morricone Youth resumed performing live in 2011.  Current members include Devon E. Levins (guitar), John Castro (bass/vocals), Dan Kessler and Jefferson Rabb (analog keyboards/synthesizers), Evan Francis and Fraser Campbell (saxophone, flute, clarinet), Aaron Bahr (trumpet), Sami Stevens (vocals), and Brian Kantor and Eric Reeves (drums).

Guitarist/founder Devon E. Levins hosted a weekly Internet radio show from 2007 to 2014 under the same name on East Village Radio playing primarily obscure film and television soundtracks and library music and interviewing soundtrack composers such as Lalo Schifrin, Howard Blake, Irmin Schmidt of Can, Claudio Simonetti and Maurizio Guarini of Goblin, Sven Libaek, John Lurie, Danny Elfman, Elliot Goldenthal, Cliff Martinez, Carter Burwell, Fabio Frizzi, Alessandro Alessandroni, Jean Michel Jarre, Suzanne Ciani, Andrzej Korzynski, Warren Ellis and Alan Howarth.  The radio show has since moved to WFMU under the new name Morricone Island.

Bassist John Castro is the son of bebop jazz pianist Joe Castro.

Discography
Albums:
Magnum Force (2003) Country Club Records (CCR-003)
Silenzio Violento (2005) Country Club Records (CC01013)
Mad Max (2017) Country Club Records (CCR-009)
Sunrise: A Song Of Two Humans (2017) Country Club Records (CCR-010)
Danger: Diabolik (2018) Country Club Records (CCR-011)
The Last Porno Show: Original Soundtrack (2020) Country Club Records (CCR-012)
The Lodger: The Story Of The London Fog (2021) Country Club Records (CCR-013)

EPs:
The Times Square (2001) Country Club Records (CCR-001)
The Sicilian Clan (2004) Country Club Records (CCR-004)
The Adventures of Prince Achmed (2016) Country Club Records (CCR-007)
Night of the Living Dead (2016) Country Club Records (CCR-008)

External links
The Official Morricone Youth Website
Morricone Island Radio Show
Morricone Youth Radio Show Archives

References
[ Allmusic]
San Diego Reader
Nitehawk Cinema

Musical groups established in 1999
Musical groups from New York City
1999 establishments in New York City
Light In The Attic Records artists